Pich is a given name and surname. Notable people with the name include:

 Róbert Pich (born 1988), Slovak footballer
 Sopheap Pich (born 1971), Cambodian American artist
 Pich Sophea (born 1985), Cambodian singer

See also

Khmer-language names